Universal is the tenth studio album by English electronic band Orchestral Manoeuvres in the Dark (OMD), released on 2 September 1996 by Virgin Records. Frontman Andy McCluskey opted for a more organic, acoustic sound on the record, which peaked at number 24 on the UK Albums Chart. It was generally well-received by music critics, although the British media's overall resistance to OMD – who had been rendered unfashionable by the prevalence of grunge and indie rock – prompted McCluskey to dissolve the group. Universal was their last album until 2010's History of Modern.

The album spawned the singles "Walking on the Milky Way" (a number 17 hit in the UK) and "Universal".

Background
McCluskey opted for a more organic sound on Universal, while looking to capture an "epic" feel. He explained, "I'd abandoned techno/house; it was like an old man dying his hair jet-black: ridiculous. I decided to follow the current trend of getting more acoustic, using real drums and bass." McCluskey had been writing with former Kraftwerk member Karl Bartos, who had also become interested in more organic music. Bartos is credited as a co-writer on "The Moon & the Sun". McCluskey described "The Boy from the Chemist Is Here to See You" as "late OMD, doing late Pulp, doing early Roxy Music" (co-producers Matthew Vaughan and David Nicholas had worked on Pulp's 1995 album, Different Class).

OMD co-founder Paul Humphreys, who had departed the group in 1989, served as co-writer on "Very Close to Far Away" and "If You're Still in Love with Me". The former marked Humphreys' first songwriting collaboration with McCluskey since leaving the band; the latter dated to 1987 and had originally been envisioned as a reggae song. Anne Dudley of Art of Noise arranged "If You're Still in Love with Me" for a 12-piece string section. The album features various session musicians, including Phil Spalding, Chuck Sabo and Carol Kenyon.

McCluskey rented a house in Dublin, and worked within the city at The Factory studio. He also recorded at Townhouse and Metropolis in London, as well as JE Sound in Los Angeles.

Alternative titles for the album were Very Close to Far Away and That Was Then, This Is Now. The cover artwork was designed by Area, based on a concept by Peter Saville.

Reception

Universal met with generally favourable reviews. Music Week gave the record a full five stars and named it their "Album of the Week", writing, "Packed with hits, drunk on pomp, Andy McCluskey has never sounded or written better and the production is a joy." Debbi Voller of Q described the record as "more ethereal than electronic", adding, "Lyrically, this is a collection of songs about lost youth, doomed love and broken dreams – and yet the music is wonderfully uplifting... McCluskey is still a master of melody". NMEs Simon Williams noted that Universal finds McCluskey "in reassuringly romping mode", the music "crispy clear, serenely syrupy, occasionally spiritual, frequently lovelorn, cosmically old-fashioned and extremely expensive-sounding". He concluded that "nothing else is anywhere near as slinky as '...Milky Way', but OMD should take heart: they're still miles better than Tears for Sodding Fears."

Retrospectively, Guinness Rockopedia author David Roberts saw Universal as a "partial return to form" following the group's "bland but chart-worthy" output during the early 1990s. Trouser Press wrote that the album "settles into the type of pop OMD has offered since [1985's] Crush" and is "enjoyable enough for what it is". Wyndham Wallace of Classic Pop said the record "ha[s] its moments" but includes some jarring departures in sound, such as baggy and spiritual elements. AllMusic editor Stephen Thomas Erlewine was critical, observing "only a fraction of the sophisticated craft that made its predecessor Liberator enjoyable, and none of the adventurous spirit of [OMD's] '80s records."

By 1996 the British media was reluctant to promote OMD, who had been rendered unfashionable by the prevalence of grunge and indie rock. McCluskey, therefore, elected to dissolve the group. He later said, "I could have gone techno, I could have gone hip-hop – nothing I could have done would have actually made Universal sell more." Original keyboardist Paul Humphreys, who did not play on Universal, regarded it as a "really, really good record".

Track listing

Personnel
 Andy McCluskey – vocals, keyboards, production, mix on tracks 8–9
 Matthew Vaughan – keyboards on tracks 1, 4, 8, and 10, guitar on tracks 2, 3, and 5, piano on track 3, bass on track 9, production on tracks 1–7, and tracks 10–12
 Breda Dunne – backing vocals on track 1
 Phil Spalding – bass on tracks 1–3, track 5, and track 7, backing vocals on track 2
 Chuck Sabo – drums and percussion on tracks 1–3, track 5, and tracks 7–9
 Hannah Clive – backing vocals on track 2
 Carol Kenyon – backing vocals on track 5
 Richard Allen Singers – vocals on track 6, courtesy of Smithsonian Folkways Recordings
 Jimmy Taylor – guitar on track 7
 Maggie Keane – backing vocals on track 8
 Anne Dudley – string arrangement for track 10
 David Nicholas – production on tracks 1–7, and tracks 10–12, engineer, mix on tracks 2–10, and 12
 Gregg Jackman – mix on tracks 1, and 11
 Julie Gardner – engineer, assistant engineer
 Neil Tucker – assistant engineer

Charts

References

External links
 Album lyrics

1996 albums
Orchestral Manoeuvres in the Dark albums
Virgin Records albums